Saletto was a comune (municipality) in the Province of Padua in the Italian region Veneto, located about  southwest of Venice and about  southwest of Padua.

Saletto bordered the following former and current municipalities: Megliadino San Fidenzio (former), Montagnana, Noventa Vicentina, Ospedaletto Euganeo, Poiana Maggiore, Santa Margherita d'Adige (former).

Since 17 February 2018 Saletto is part of Borgo Veneto municipality.

Demographic evolution

References

Cities and towns in Veneto